Treptower Tollensewinkel (with a silent w) is an Amt in the Mecklenburgische Seenplatte district, in Mecklenburg-Vorpommern, Germany. The seat of the Amt is in Altentreptow.

The Amt Treptower Tollensewinkel consists of the following municipalities:

Ämter in Mecklenburg-Western Pomerania
Mecklenburgische Seenplatte (district)